US Airways Express was the brand name for the regional affiliate of US Airways, under which a number of individually owned commuter air carriers and regional airlines operate short and medium haul routes. This code sharing service was previously operated as USAir Express.  Mainline carriers often outsource to regional airlines to operate services in order to increase frequency, serve routes that would not sustain larger aircraft, or for other competitive reasons. US Airways Express operations were conducted from smaller markets in the United States, Canada, and the Bahamas primarily centered on US Airways' major hubs and focus cities. Upon the completion of US Airways' merger process with American Airlines, US Airways Express was rebranded as American Eagle on October 17, 2015.

History

US Airways Express traced its beginnings to 1967, when Henson Airlines began operating as Allegheny Commuter, a feeder carrier for Allegheny Airlines, predecessor to US Airways.  The initial route was Baltimore-Hagerstown.  This is generally credited as the industry's first code-share agreement and the first major airline to use another airline as its commuter partner.  Through the 1970's many other commuter airlines would join the Allegheny Commuter system providing feeder service from small communities for Allegheny Airlines. Allegheny Airlines was changed to USAir in 1979 however the feeder network still carried the name of Allegheny Commuter until 1989 when it was changed to USAir Express. In 1997 USAir changed its name again to US Airways at which time the feeder network became US Airways Express. Two major carriers that merged into USAir in the late 1980's, Pacific Southwest Airlines (PSA) and Piedmont Airlines (1948-1989) had their corporate names retained to protect their trademarks. Henson Airlines later took on the name Piedmont Airlines and another USAir Express carrier, Jetstream International took on the name of PSA Airlines. The aircraft and other characteristics of the rebranded regional carriers bear no relation to their namesakes however many of the routes of Piedmont Airlines are former routes of the original Piedmont Airlines (1948-1989).

The aircraft livery of US Airways Express aircraft was identical to US Airways' mainline colors except for the word Express which is attached to the basic US Airways livery. In April 2013, an internal memo distributed to American Eagle employees at American Airlines Group's subsidiaries: (OW) Executive Airlines and American Eagle; indicated the US Airways Express banner and marketing brand, were expected to be discontinued although the remaining and independently operating airline subsidiaries, were expected to continue but operated with American Eagle branded colors.

Destinations

Operators and fleet

Fleet

Historical regional jet fleet
The US Airways Express brand, through its various regional and commuter airline partners, operated a variety of twinjet aircraft over the years including the following types:

 Embraer ERJ-145

Historical turboprop fleet
The US Airways Express brand, through its various regional and commuter airline partners, operated a variety of twin turboprop aircraft over the years including the following types:

 BAe Jetstream 31
 Beechcraft Model 18
 Beechcraft Model 99
 Beechcraft 1300
 Beechcraft 1900C
 Beechcraft 1900D
 Bombardier Q200
 Cessna 402
 de Havilland Canada Dash 7
 Dornier 328
 Embraer EMB-120
 Nord 262
 Saab 340
 Short 330
 Short 360

Accidents and incidents
 January 3, 1992, CommutAir Flight 4281 a Beechcraft 1900C operating for USAir Express, was flying from Plattsburgh to Saranac Lake when it crashed into wooded mountaintop as it was landing at Adirondack Regional Airport. Of the 4 people on board (2 passengers and 2 crew) 2 died while the other 2 sustained serious injuries. The cause of the crash was determined to be pilot error in establishing a stabilized approach and cross-checking instruments.
 January 8, 2003, Air Midwest Flight 5481 a Beechcraft 1900D operated by Air Midwest as US Airways Express under a franchise agreement, crashed into an airport hangar and burst into flames 37 seconds after leaving Charlotte/Douglas International Airport located in Charlotte, North Carolina for Greenville-Spartanburg International Airport in Greer, South Carolina. All 19 passengers and 2 pilots aboard died in the crash. The NTSB concluded that the standard estimates used when calculating the aircraft’s weight were inaccurate. These estimates were subsequently changed. Additionally, improper maintenance that was performed on the aircraft resulted in the crew’s inability to recover from the stall, caused by a dangerous center of gravity resulting from improper weight estimates. 
 August 26, 2003, Colgan Air Flight 9446 a positioning flight involving a Beechcraft 1900D, crashed just before take-off at Barnstable Municipal Airport in Massachusetts killing both crew members on board. The NTSB stated that the probable cause of the accident was to do with the pilot not noticing maintenance errors with the aircraft.
 November 16, 2008, Flight 4551, a US Airways Express de Havilland Dash 8 turboprop operated by Piedmont Airlines, took off from Lehigh Valley International Airport at 8:20am heading to Philadelphia International Airport, had to make an emergency landing.  The flight crew was indicated that the front nose gear hadn't come down and had to make a flyover the runway for confirmation.  Of 35 passengers and 3 crew, there were no injuries. The aircraft (N326EN) incurred only minor damage and was returned to service shortly thereafter.
 January 1, 2011, US Airways Express Flight 4352, operated by Piedmont Airlines forced an evacuation of the U.S. Capitol and fighter jets were scrambled from Andrews Air Force Base after Flight 4352, operated by a De Havilland Canada Dash 8-100 suffered radio problems on approach to Washington, DC's Washington–National and strayed into restricted airspace. The Capitol was evacuated for approximately 20 minutes until the Dash-8 aircraft landed at Reagan National Airport.
 May 18, 2013, Flight 4560 operated by Piedmont Airlines made a belly landing at Newark Liberty International Airport after landing gear would not extend. All passengers and crew members were evacuated safely.

See also 
 List of defunct airlines of the United States

References

External links

US Airways Group
Defunct airlines of the United States
Airlines established in 1967
Airlines disestablished in 2015
Former Star Alliance affiliate members
Regional airline brands